Almanac of the Dead is a novel by Leslie Marmon Silko, first published in 1991.

Overview
Although the print edition of Almanac of the Dead features a "Five Hundred Year Map," e-book versions of the novel omit the map. The map depicts Silko's stylized version of the heart of the novel's geographical, historical and conceptual narrative extent, with lines radiating outward from Tucson, Arizona to New Jersey in the northeast, San Diego in the west, and Tuxtla Gutiérrez in the Mexican state of Chiapas in the south. Other cities and towns in the US and Mexico are accompanied by character names and notes that pertain to both the novel's narrative and historical events. Almanac of the Dead'''s complex linked narratives largely unfolds within this mapped space, although episodes also take place in or reference previous events in numerous other places (including Colombia and Argentina, and the map names Alaska, Cuba, and Haiti as part of a graphic representation "in a transnational perspective") showing "the history of the modern/colonial world system from a particular local history" centered on Tucson. The map presents itself as a map of "Mexico" alone, with no mention of the United States of America and without showing contemporary state or national borders. In an interview, Silko explains that she "drew that map in Almanac as a 'glyphic' representation of the narrative. This 'glyph' shows how the Americas are 'one,' not separated by artificial, imaginary 'borders.' The landscapes, the spirits of the places are known by the narratives that originate in these places." The map corresponds roughly to the novel's complex structure, which consists of six named parts divided into books and named chapters. 

Much of the story takes place in the narrative "present", although lengthy flashbacks and myths tied to indigenous knowledge are also woven into the plot.

 Plot 
 Part One: The United States of America 
The opening section consists of eight books with many smaller chapters that total 234 pages. In this section, readers are introduced to the characters: Lecha, Zeta, Seese, Sterling, Yoeme, Calabazas, Ferro, Paulie, David, Eric, Beaufrey, Jamey, Root, Mosca, Mahwala, Sarita, and Liria. These characters are the core of what animates the expository elements and conflicts of the opening section of the novel. Most of this section takes place in Arizona, New Mexico, and Southern California.

Part Two: Mexico
This section only has two books: "Reign of Death Eye-Dog" and "Reign of Fire-Eye Macaw". It still consists of interconnected shorts and totals around 91 pages. All the characters from Part One disappear; Menardo, Iliana, Alegria, General J, Green Lee, El Grupo, Bartolomeo, Angelita La Escapia, El Feo, and Tacho are introduced. All the events occur in Tuxtla, Chiapas or in and around Mexico City. Also, while the narrative stays in the third person omniscient, Silko plays more loosely with the point of view of characters, at times just moving through various characters' consciousness within scenes or over spans of time. There is a first-person narration in the opening pages.

Part Three: Africa
This section of the novel consists of three books: "New Jersey", "Arizona", and "El Paso". It spans 117 pages. In this section, some of the characters from Parts One and Two re-appear: Menardo, Alegria, Zeta, and Lecha are mentioned, while others return fully to the center of the narrative. Other characters are introduced: Max Blue, Leah, Trigg, Rambo-Roy, Clinton, Sonny Blue, Bingo, Angelo, Marilyn, Peaches, and Judge Arne. Sterling, Ferro, Paulie, Seese, and Jamey close out book three's final five chapters.

 Part Four: The Americas 
This section takes place in Mexico and Colombia. It is split into two books: "Mountains" and "Rivers," and totals 100 pages. Not only are the lives and desires of Menardo, Alegria, El Feo, Tacho, Bartolomeo, and Angelita La Escapia further fleshed out, we finally get access to the shadow characters of Beaufrey and Serlo. In the "Rivers" book, the latter two characters have gone to Colombia with David to make deals, ride horses, sniff coke, and indulge any of their other desires. Beaufrey and Serlo's personal histories are also developed and shown to be narcissists obsessed with the pure blood of their European ancestors and making an alternative world away not only from Black, Native, Asian, or mixed people but white people who they claim to be of lower class rank and status. While Serlo claims he is an asexual heterosexual, Beaufrey is gay, has a fetish for torture videos, and is revealed to be using David for nothing more than sex and emotional manipulation. Both Beaufrey and Serlo are also revealed to be part of what made Seese and David's child Monte disappear, while explicitly stating how much pleasure they had in watching David and Seese suffer through the abduction.

 Part Five: The Fifth World 
The fifth section of the novel continues to have the various storylines and plot points converge. At nearly 140 pages, it is the second longest section of the novel. It is made up of three books: "The Foes," "The Warriors," and "The Struggle". In the first book "The Foes," readers get more detailed pieces of what is contained in Almanac of the Dead, while also understanding the other traumas Lech and Zeta experienced as young women. Simultaneously the sisters learn of La Escapia, and El Feo, and Tacho (who like them are twins) and their resistance efforts. Seese's plot point is also recentered, and we learn she was also from Tucson where she worked as a stripper for Tiny, who for most of the novel was a tertiary character. Mosca and Calabazas' characters are further developed as well. Mosca's character develops an obsession for the Blue family and their businesses in Tucson, while Calabazas is shown to be compassionate, yet losing his edge. Readers also learn about Liria and Sarita's work on the border. All these characters' worlds become explicitly connected to Max Blue and his family in "The Warriors" book. This is due to Mosca's plan that makes Sonny begin to a feud with the Tucson police. Judge Arne's character also gains more space within this section and is shown to be as powerful as Max Blue and deranged as Serlo or Beaufrey. The third book, "The Struggle" finds Alegria crossing the Mexico-U.S. border, while we are introduced to a new character, Awa Gee, who is a close friend of Zeta. Awa Gee is a Korean computer scientist that hacks the U.S. government and develops weapons for the poor. Awa Gee becomes a vital component of Zeta's plan. Beyond Awa Gee, readers are given more access to Ferro's lover Jamey. By the end of this section, three more major deaths occur.

 Part Six: One World, Many Tribes 
This is the shortest section of the novel at 53 pages in length. It has one book called "Prophecy". Two new leaders of the resistance movement named Wilson Weasel Tail and the Barefoot Hopi deliver dramatic and dynamic speeches at a convention attended by mostly young white people. Lecha, Zeta, Awa Gee, Clinton, Rambo-Roy, Angelita (on behalf of the twin brothers), Root, Calabazas, and Mosca all meet and exchange their perspectives and strategies with the two leaders. A rebel cell called the Eco-terrorists also attends the convention. The attendees present various short discussions of their philosophical views. In the end, many characters' narrative arcs are not completed, and other characters are killed off, while others close out the book in "normative" ways. More importantly, the conclusion reinforces the idea and symbol of an almanac as always updated, but never completed. 

 Characters Lecha - A “well-known psychic ... returning home” after years of being away because she is dying of cancer. Lecha “has come home to get things in order before she died.” She is Zeta's twin sister and has the ability to see into people's lives and futures, or what the western world characterizes as a Psychic. She exploits this gift for some time in her life even becoming a TV personality before she decides to return to the work left by her grandmother. Lecha is also part of Calabazas' organization and has traveled around the Americas.Zeta - Lecha's twin sister. She stayed in Arizona and raised Lecha's son Ferro. She, before Lecha, decided to return to the work left to them by their grandmother. Zeta and Lecha's mother was an indigenous woman from Mexico who was impregnated by a white man. After their mother dies the twins' father returns for a strange short period in their lives. Zeta has also ties to Calabazas' organization.Seese - A young white woman who was living in San Diego where she became an addict and fell in love with a bisexual man named David. They had a child, who was later is abducted and possibly killed. When Seese watches Lecha on TV she drives to Tucson to find her.Sterling - An older Laguna Indian from New Mexico who is exiled from his tribe/community after he fails to protect them from a Hollywood film crew that disrespects their native lands. He has wandered across the American southwest since his twenties and loves to read crime histories of early America. He is recruited by two of Calabazas' men while drinking at a bar and works as a gardener for Lecha, Zeta, and Calabazas.Yoeme - Lecha and Zeta's Maya grandmother. She abandoned her family (Lecha and Zeta's mother) when she was young because she knew they were not strong enough to survive the colonial violence of white settlers. Yoeme returns to the twins' life, teaches them harsh lessons and histories of the American southwest, and hands them a book called the Almanac of the Dead that she wants them to finish in due time.Calabazas - An old Yaqui Indian who has run a clandestine business and organization between Tucson and Sonora for over 40 years. Lecha was his lover for a short time, and he has a wife named Sarita. For most of his married life, he desired Sarita's younger sister Liria.Ferro - Lecha's son. He was overweight and effeminate as a young boy and was teased a lot as well. He also harbors a lot of resentment for his mother and Zeta, even though Zeta raised him in the same cold and calculating ways Yoeme raised her. Ferro is gay and has two lovers: one in his recent past named Jamey, and another named Paulie. Ferro also works with Calabazas.Paulie - Works at the home Zeta and Ferro live at. He controls the many dogs on the land. He was in prison with Ferro and is now his lover.David - A bisexual artist from San Diego. He was a former escort before Beaufrey fell for him and took care of him. Beaufrey eventually helps David become a well-known artist. David is at the core of a love triangle with Seese, Eric, and Beaufrey. He and Seese have a child named Monte who was more than likely kidnapped and killed by a jealous Beaufrey.Eric - A young gay man from a conservative family in Texas. He moves to San Diego to live his truth, but also falls in love with, and becomes a lover of David. Like Seese, Eric becomes an addict and is also hated by Beaufrey.Jamey - Ferro's lover who is addicted to cocaine.Root - Is part white, Mexican, and Indian. His mother was a German woman who married a dark mestizo man in the Army. Root is Lecha's on-and-off lover, and is highly intelligent. However, he had a serious accident that gave him brain damage and altered his motor functions. Despite his disabilities Root is one of Calabazas' most trusted transporters.Mosca - A dark-skinned Mexican who is also one of Calabazas' transporters. He loves to drink and do drugs and is possibly autistic. He is also fascinated with Root's accident, which he tries to contextualize and mythologize.Mahwala - The eldest of Calabazas' Yaqui tribe. She shares and communicates the land's and tribe's history to Calabazas.Sarita - Calabazas' wife from the Brito family in Sonora. Her father married her to Calabazas to pay a gambling debt, and she is also said to be highly religious (Catholic).Liria - Sarita's younger sister. She is said to have been the one to give Calabazas his name as a young girl during one of the early transports between him and their family.Menardo - An indigenous Mexican from Chiapas. Menardo and his exploits make up the majority of this part of the text. He is a self-loathing Maya who tries to conceal any indigenous part of his self and family history. As a youth, he is fat and dark-skinned, and therefore teased, so he grows up with a chip on his shoulder. He starts an insurance company that is fledgling until a major earthquake hits (a possible allusion by Silko to the major natural disaster of '85), and he pulls off a miraculous feat that makes the community members adore him. He gains many customers and other opportunities open up for him. Even though he is portrayed as a sort of lucky fool, Menardo's wealth only grows. He marries a woman named Iliana and gains monetary connections from Tucson to Guatemala.Iliana - A local from Tuxtla whose family claims they are direct descendants of the colonizer Juan de Oñate. She grows up spoiled, and loves expensive things, but can't bear children for Menardo. She spends most of her time with the other wives of El Grupo. Her family hates Menardo.Alegria - A woman from Venezuela that was educated in Spain. She is a white young architect working for a major firm in Mexico City. She is assigned to build Menardo's lavish house for Iliana. She lives with her boyfriend Bartolomeo in Mexico City. Alegria begins an affair with Menardo as she designs and constructs his home. Iliana suspects nothing.General J - Is from Guatemala and part of Menardo's inner circle. He, like others in the novel, denies he has ties to any indigenous blood. He hates communism and is actively strategizing with Menardo to quell rising rebellions within Mexico. He is basically Menardo's muscle but not in any way shown to be a subordinate of his.Green Lee - An arms dealer from Tucson. He is another of Menardo's connections.El Grupo - Is made up of characters that are just given names like The Police Chief, The Judge, The Governor, and The Ambassador. They occupy a central place in this part of the novel as they are the men Menardo is constantly in communication with about their money, their wives, and the state of Mexico as a country.Angelita La Escapia - An indigenous Maya woman from Mexico City. She is the head of a leftist rebel cell that is tracking Menardo's activities. She reports back to her indigenous community members who grow suspicious of her love of Karl Marx's book Das Kapital. Her love for Marx is rooted in the idea that he is the only white man who has ever told the truth, through rigorous research and evidence, about the savagery of white people and capitalism. She views Marx through an indigenous lens and constantly speaks of his materialist shortcomings. She is also involved in a relationship with Bartolomeo, though she is plotting on him as well because he is a white Cuban who also thinks indigenous people are stupid.Bartolomeo - A white Cuban who runs a communist center in Mexico City. He is supposed to be sleeping with Alegria to get information for his group about Menardo and others. He is generally represented as someone who is only in it for himself.El Feo - is from the same indigenous community as Angelita La Escapia. He was sent to keep an eye on her but agrees with the ways she is organizing and moving forward.Tacho - Menardo and Iliana's indigenous chauffeur. He deals with Menardo and Iliana's constant micro-aggressions, but also helps decipher Menardo's constant surreal and violent dreams. This allows Tacho to keep Macaws in their backyard. Tacho is depicted as observant and calculating. He is tied to the same cells as Angelita, Bartolomeo, and El Feo.Max Blue - A Vietnam War veteran known as a mafia figure/boss in New Jersey. During his time in the war, he survived a plane crash which is a sort of omen for Max. The opening of Part Three has him surviving an assassination attempt that kills his brother Bill. These events are said to change Max and make him retire from organized crime. He moves his family to Tucson, where he spends all his time playing golf.Leah - Max's wife. She works in real estate and constantly cheats on Max because he has no interest in having sex with her. Max knows of Leah's infidelities and does not care. Though she is not fond of Arizona, Leah does manage to hustle and obtain large amounts of valuable property in the area.Trigg - An alcoholic businessman who lost his ability to walk in a car accident. Trigg is also racist, sexist, and becomes Leah's primary lover. He is so obsessed with power and regaining his ability to walk, that he builds a blood and organ bank with the help of his assistant Peaches, and a homeless veteran named Roy. Ultimately, readers come to find that Trigg has other means to gain donors to his organ and blood banks.Rambo-Roy - A Vietnam War veteran. He works for Trigg but uses the money he makes to organize other homeless men, veterans in particular because he has a vision to build an army to overthrow the government. He does not trust Trigg and has a crush on the assistant Peaches.Clinton - A Vietnam War veteran. Clinton is also the first central Black character of the novel. He is homeless like Roy, and they become partners in plotting a resistance. Clinton's focus is on liberating Black Americans from the shackles of American historical, religious, and economic bondage. Outside of Max Blue, Clinton is the most prominent figure of Part Three. He retells how he survived Vietnam, his days in college, the history of Black Indians, and how he looks to center pre-colonial African spirituality in his daily life.Sonny Blue - Max's son, but Leah is not his biological mother. He had inherited a small portion of the family's business running slots and vending machines yet this is not enough for him. Sonny negotiates a guns and drugs deal with people in Mexico. Sonny is also cruel to Leah and his younger brother and like many other characters overtly sexist and racist.Bingo - Max's other son, who is not only picked on by Sonny but is pathetically mediocre all his life. He developed a cocaine addiction once he found out about his father's life and business. Alongside his brother he cares for the slots and vending machines.Angelo - Max and Leah's nephew. Angelo's father did not want to be part of the family business, but he does. Angelo begins to work with his cousin Sonny, but Bingo does not trust the woman Angelo is in love with. Angelo also believes Sonny is money hungry and untrustworthy.Marilyn - The woman Angelo is in love with. She also seems to have strong feelings for him but chooses to go back to be with her husband.Peaches - Trigg's assistant. She knows all of his secrets and hints at them to Roy. Peaches is smart and calculating.Judge Arne - Is caught up in small scandal tied to Ferro's lover Jamey. He is not worried about it though, because Arne has found someone else on who he can place stronger blame on. Judge Arne also plays golf with Max Blue.

 Themes 

Part one
While this section of the novel moves through different points of view of characters, and the various aspects and histories of their lives and families, a complex matrix of conflict and violence is mapped on an emotional and personal level. Yet, this mapping of conflict and violence is also about how we tell and imagine events. One of the most important aspects of what Silko is doing with this part of the text is not only decentering white settler colonial representations of the American Southwest, but reimagining what took place, or is told to be historical fact.

While characters do what they do in the present moments of the text, Silko creates this "narrative blanket" that not only muddies the 'us versus them' narrative of white settlers brutalizing the various indigenous peoples of North America, but she highlights the myriad of ways indigenous people fought among themselves; and how Mexicans attacked Indigenous people with the type of ferocity the whites had (and vice versa). This is not to say what she calls the days of the Death-Eye Dog are not mainly a result of the maniacal colonial imposition of white people, but Silko outlines the ways that even through genocide, there were many intercommunal betrayals alongside ample organized formations of resistance and survival by indigenous peoples: in this section, it is mostly Yaqui and Apache groups. A common flashback is the story of Geronimo. Silko recreates what has been taught in schools and popular media and shapes something more dynamic and rooted in the power of imagining different worlds dedicated to resistance movements.

Furthermore, by the end of this section, the reader is shown the origins of the Almanac of the Dead. It is a terrifying section that places youth at the center of bravery and survival, while also playing with ideas around orality, and the necessity of knowledge being passed down through generations; even if those communities have few people left to tell their stories.

Part two
While the narrative shifts in terms of location and characters, the ideas around the ways indigenous people are subjugated and resistance continues throughout this part of the novel. Violence is still central to the ways characters see, imagine, and define the world. Yet, while Part One was in many a contemporaneous indigenous perspective, Part Two centers on the descendants of the victors of colonialism, and people of color who wish and aspire to assimilate into White Supremacists Capitalist Patriarchy's vision of the world. Here, Silko is unflinching in the ways she characterizes white or white passing Latinos: constantly referencing their European bloodlines; insatiable material needs; obsessed with sex as a vehicle of power; jealous and conniving; a dehumanizing ideology that looks to disparage, exploit, and ultimately plunder anything that is not white, white-passing, or of refinement. Even characters like Bartolomeo and Alegria are shown to be bourgeois in their sensibilities and dismissive of the indigenous people they interact with. Menardo, who is an indigenous Maya, dark, fat, of low familial status, only achieves his success through consistent deliberate denial and dismissal of anything Indian from his past, and way of seeing and being. This is the environment of micro dictators and their private militias. In many ways, Menardo, General J, Green Lee, El Grupo, Iliana, Alegria, and Bartolomeo define the era of Death-Eye Dog (referenced at the end of Part One): money, sex, violence, and fear driving all life towards misery.

Yet Angelita, Tacho, and El Feo (and sometimes even Alegria) all provide sparks of hope and rebellion to the dark and deranged madness of the other characters.

Part three
While expository like the other sections, this portion of the novel for the most part seems to plateau or bring the conflicts and rising action to a lull. The reader is left wondering why we are introduced to yet another set of characters that seem for the most part not tied to any of the other sections and are far less dynamic as characters. Yet, Silko seems to be deliberate in the ways she paces out this chunk of the book. The bold imaginative histrionics are tuned down (outside of Clinton's passages), but as readers, we see how many of the characters in Part Three mirror the power and blood lust of those found in Part Two. Men with money and a penchant for violence, abuse and crave the flesh and bodies of the poor, homeless, women, and people of color. Therefore, the borderlands are constructed as this space where many are left to the desires of crazed men. Also by the end of Part Three, we understand Max Blue is not as passive and retired as we have been led to believe; his son has ties to major characters in Mexico, and characters like Bingo, Sterling, and Ferro become very suspicious of the relationships people are having. Ferro and Paulie's relationship is also further developed when we find out that Sesse is digitally transcribing the Almanac for Lecha.

Furthermore, organizing rebellion stays an important detailed component of the narrative's internal schema. Silko makes sure Clinton and Roy, much like Angelita La Escapia and Tacho, are forming some type of resistance to the madness within the text.

Lastly, on symbolic or aesthetic levels, the reader begins to understand the very brilliant ways Silko subverts the typical look, body, and background of normative protagonists and antagonists. Characters are not fully able-bodied, they are loved for or embrace being fat, they are not stereotypically beautiful or attractive (and in fact characters who tend to be taken advantage of), homeless characters are not ornaments to main characters, also many characters move through the spectrum of LGBT sexuality, and the old are just as essential as the young to the plot. It's an element of storytelling, in particular within American narrative, that is often treated as an afterthought. Readers of Almanac of the Dead'' are forced to invest in characters we have been socialized to hate, stigmatize, and marginalize.

Part four
The "Rivers" section of part four is possibly the most emotionally "grey", stylistically cold, and visually macabre of the novel. It serves as a stark contrast to "Mountains" which is full of action, emotion, and redemption. With Part Four, the reader begins to get a sense that Silko's "mapping" and exploration of death and violence across the Americas is not going to end well for any of the characters. From a craft perspective, the reader is also understanding that each small chapter within the "books," while told from a sort of omniscient third-person perspective, is in many ways tied to the POV character of the section. For instance, Angelita La Escapia is the POV character for "On Trial for Crimes Against Tribal Histories". That section is different than "Sangre Pura," where Beaufry is the POV character in mood and some ways. This is found to be consistent throughout the novel and challenges the reader to grasp the complexity of the characters' interwoven conflicts. Lastly, there are four major deaths within Part Four.

Part five
Power, visions, sex, and violence are pretty much the norm this deep into the text. The threat of war is on all characters' minds, and each is strategizing their survival. Silko also seems to be very intentional on what side all these characters appear to be on while foreshadowing that many partnerships are not to be trusted. Silko is also diligent enough to show the different ways the various characters and their communities foresee the future of the world coming about. In terms of craft, the novel also begins to take on more "color and design". Character features, the spaces they inhabit, the color of things in and around them, and the small details that signal emotion or mood changes are written into the sentences more frequently. One can assume the purpose is that as the story begins to near its resolution that the many characters we've been following all appear more visually and viscerally in the actual words of the text.

References

1991 American novels
American magic realism novels
Novels by Leslie Marmon Silko
Native American novels
Novels set in Mexico
Novels set in Arizona
Novels set in California